The Phantom Gondola (Italian: La gondola delle chimere) is a 1936 French-Italian drama film directed by Augusto Genina and starring Marcelle Chantal, Henri Rollan and Paul Bernard. The film was a co-production between the two countries shot at the Cines Studios in Rome and based on a 1926 novel by Maurice Dekobra.

Synopsis
A British aristocrat falls in love with a Venetian Count, without realising that he is a spy against the Turks. When she discovers that he has been captured by the notorious Sélim Pacha she does everything she can to save him.

Cast

Reception
Writing for The Spectator in 1936, Graham Greene gave the film a poor review, characterizing it as "a cheap, trivial and pretentious story by a popular writer of rather low reputation." While acknowledging that "it is one of the only two films this last year I have found myself unable to endure till the end," and that he had not therefore completed the entire film, Greene explained his action "for never has a melodrama proceeded so slowly, with such a saga-like tread".

See also
 Change of Heart (1928), with Juliette Compton as Lady Winham
 Madonna of the Sleeping Cars (1928), with Claude France as Lady Diana Wynham
 Madonna of the Sleeping Cars (1955), with Gisèle Pascal as Lady Diana Wyndham

References

Bibliography 
 Nowell-Smith, Geoffrey & Hay, James & Volpi, Gianni. The Companion to Italian Cinema. Cassell, 1996.

External links 
 

1936 films
Italian drama films
French drama films
1936 drama films
1930s Italian-language films
Films directed by Augusto Genina
Films set in Venice
Italian black-and-white films
Films based on French novels
Cines Studios films
French black-and-white films
1930s Italian films
1930s French films